Jijimi is a type of Korean stew made by boiling meat, fish or vegetables. It is thicker than guk, but thinner than jjigae. Joseon mussang sinsik yori jebeop, the first color-printed Korean cookbook published in 1924, states that "Jijimi tastes better than guk, and jjigae tastes better than jijimi, being smaller in quantity and savorier."

Types

References 

Korean soups and stews